This is a list of the extreme points of Ireland – the points that are farthest north, south, east or west in Ireland. It includes the Republic of Ireland and Northern Ireland.

Often the term "Malin to Mizen" is used when encompassing the entire island from north to south. The geographical centre of Ireland is 8.85 kilometres north-northwest of Athlone Town.

Whole island

Including islands
Points:
Northernmost point: Tor Beg rock northeast of Inishtrahull, County Donegal, Republic of Ireland (ROI)
Southernmost point: Fastnet Rock southeast of Cape Clear Island, County Cork, ROI
Westernmost point: Tearaght Island, County Kerry, ROI
Easternmost point: Cannon Rock, County Down, Northern Ireland (NI)
Settlements:
Northernmost settlement: Ballyhillin, Inishowen Peninsula, County Donegal
Southernmost settlement: Clear Island, County Cork
Westernmost settlement: Dunquin, Dingle Peninsula, County Kerry
Easternmost settlement: Portavogie, Ards Peninsula, County Down (NI)

Mainland only
Points:
Northernmost point: Banba's Crown (the tip of Malin Head), Inishowen Peninsula, County Donegal, Republic of Ireland (Latitude: 55° 23′ 4″ N)
Southernmost point: Brow Head (near Mizen Head), County Cork, Republic of Ireland (Latitude: 51° 26′ 52″ N)
Easternmost point: Burr Point, Ards Peninsula, County Down, Northern Ireland (Longitude: 5° 25′ 58″ W)
Settlements:
Northernmost settlement: Ballyhillin, Inishowen Peninsula, County Donegal, Ulster, Republic of Ireland
Southernmost settlement: Crookhaven, County Cork, Republic of Ireland
Westernmost settlement: Dunquin, Dingle Peninsula, County Kerry, Republic of Ireland
Easternmost settlement: Portavogie, Ards Peninsula, County Down, Northern Ireland

Altitude
 Highest point: Carrauntoohil, County Kerry, Republic of Ireland (1,041 m / 3,466 ft)
 Highest settlement: Meelin, County Cork, Republic of Ireland  (254 m / 832 ft)
 Lowest point: North Slob, County Wexford, Republic of Ireland

Many points are on, or near sea level, but due to high rainfall, there are no natural dry pieces of land below sea level - see rivers and loughs below.

Republic of Ireland

Including islands
Northernmost point: Inishtrahull, County Donegal
Northernmost settlement: Ballyhillin, Inishowen Peninsula, County Donegal
Southernmost point: Fastnet Rock, County Cork
Southernmost settlement: Crookhaven, County Cork
Westernmost point: Tearaght Island, County Kerry
Westernmost settlement: Dunquin, Dingle Peninsula, County Kerry
Easternmost point: Lambay Island, County Dublin
Easternmost settlement: Wicklow, County Wicklow

Mainland only
Northernmost point: Banba's Crown (the tip of Malin Head), Inishowen Peninsula, County Donegal
Northernmost settlement: Ballyhillin, Inishowen Peninsula, County Donegal
Southernmost point: Brow Head (near Mizen Head), County Cork
Southernmost settlement: Crookhaven, County Cork
Westernmost point: Dunmore Head, Dingle Peninsula, County Kerry
Westernmost settlement: Dunquin, County Kerry
Easternmost point: Wicklow Head, County Wicklow
Easternmost settlement: Wicklow, County Wicklow

Altitude
Highest point: Carrauntoohil, County Kerry
Lowest point: North Slob, County Wexford
Highest settlement: Meelin, County Cork

Many points are on, or near sea level, but due to high rainfall, there are no natural dry pieces of land below sea level - see rivers and lochs below.

Northern Ireland

Including islands
Northernmost point: Skerriagh, Ballygill North, Rathlin Island at 
Northernmost settlement: Rathlin Island, County Antrim at 
Southernmost point: Cranfield Point, County Down at 
Southernmost settlement: Greencastle, County Down at 
 Westernmost point – western part of Manger townland, County Fermanagh (immediately east of the Bradogue Bridge) at 
Westernmost settlement: Belleek, County Fermanagh at 
Easternmost point: Canon Rock, County Down at 
Easternmost settlement: Portavogie, County Down at

Mainland only
Northernmost point: Benbane Head, County Antrim at 
Northernmost settlement: Ballintoy, County Antrim at 
Southernmost point: Cranfield Point, County Down at 
Southernmost settlement: Greencastle, County Down at 
 Westernmost point – western part of Manger townland, County Fermanagh (immediately east of the Bradogue Bridge) at 
Westernmost settlement: Belleek, County Fermanagh at 
Easternmost point: Burr Point, Ards Peninsula, County Down at 
Easternmost settlement: Portavogie, County Down at

Altitude
Highest point: Slieve Donard, County Down (850 m / 2,789 ft)
Highest settlement: Greencastle, County Tyrone (188 m / 617 ft)

Many points are on, or near sea level, but due to high rainfall, there are no natural dry pieces of land below sea level.

References

See also

Extreme points of the United Kingdom
Extreme points of Europe
Extreme points of Earth
Geography of Ireland
Extreme points of the British Isles

Geography of Ireland
Ireland
Extreme points